P. Veerasenan was a notable labour unionist from Singapore. He was once the President of Standing Committee of Singapore General Labour Union (SGLU) as well as the vice-president of Singapore Federation of Trade Unions(SFTU). In his career, he befriended with S.A. Ganapathy, the former president of Pan Malayan Federation of Trade Unions (PMFTU), and Abdullah CD, chairman and currently General Secretary of the Communist Party of Malaya (CPM).

Political activism
He succeeded Ganapathy as the president of Pan Malayan Federation of Trade Unions (PMFTU). On 18 August 1946, under his leadership, Singapore Federation of Trade Unions (SFTU) organised a mass protest of 5000 was held in Singapore. He strongly criticised the Malayan Government's immigration policy and condemned negotiation by the government to bring in more Indian labourers into Malaya. He also advocates the prohibition of alcohol products among the Indian labourers as it could foresee adverse effect on the labourers. He also condemned the Advisory Council for not representing the Indian community at all in Malaya. SFTU also made an appeal to the Indian Government, Indian National Congress, Communist Party of India and the All-India Muslim League to double check on the proposed influx of Indians to Malaya.

Death
On 19 March 1949, S.A. Ganapathy was arrested at Waterfall Estate in Rawang. On 3 May 1949, a day before the prosecution of his friend, S.A. Ganapathy, he was shot dead by the British in his camp at Jelebu, Negeri Sembilan from 1/7 Gurkha Rifles. His camp was described by the military spokesman as being the First Brigade Headquarters of the Malayan National Liberation Army.

References

1949 deaths
Malaysian communists
Singaporean communists
People from Tamil Nadu
Tamil Singaporean
Singaporean trade unionists